Manda Hararo is a group of basaltic shield volcanoes in east Africa whose last eruption was in 2009. At its northern end is a small example. South of this volcano is the Gumatmali-Gablaytu fissure system, an area dominated by fissure-fed lava flows. At the centre of the complex rise two volcanoes. Manda Hararo's large size is because it is a raised block from the end of a mid-ocean ridge spreading center. It is known for its rare basalts.

Eruptions

2007 eruption

Manda Hararo first erupted on August 13, 2007. NASA's Aura Satellite detected a large sulfur dioxide plume over Ethiopia and Sudan. Satellite imagery showed a lava flow emitted by Manda Hararo. Local residents reported that no precursors to the eruption had taken place. The first sign was a sudden, heavy, cracking sound, with only a slight tremor. At 17:30, fire was seen coming from Manda Hararo, "lighting up the entire area."  Locals evacuated while the violent eruptions continued for three days. After the main eruption, lava flows continued and much of the fissure gave off strong fumarolic activity.  On August 20, a team of scientists visited the area.

2009 eruption

On 29 June another plume was detected from the same area. Imagery showed thermal anomalies coming from Manda Hararo. The fissures were lined by scoria 'ramparts'. The eruption was possibly bigger than the 2007 eruption. By the time the scientists reached the fissure, it only emitted steam.

References

 Volcano Live John Search, www.volcanolive.com

Shield volcanoes of Ethiopia
Active volcanoes
Polygenetic shield volcanoes